Tahnoun bin Mohammed Al Nahyan is the Ruler's Representative of the Eastern Region of the Emirate of Abu Dhabi, the United Arab Emirates. He was previously deputy chairman of the Executive Council of Abu Dhabi, chairman of the Abu Dhabi National Oil Company and deputy chairman of the Supreme Petroleum Council. In November 2018, the road from Al Ain to Dubai was renamed in his honor.

Education
He earned a MA from The Fletcher School at Tufts University.

Family
Sheikh Tahnoon is the brother-in-law of the founding father of the UAE president Sheikh Zayed bin Sultan Al Nahyan through his sister Sheikha Hassa's marriage to Sheikh Zayed.

References

External links
Government Structure and System
Ruler's Representative Court Eastern Region
Rulers Reperesentative court

Emirati royalty
Emirati businesspeople
Tahnoun bin Mohammed Al Nahyan
People from Abu Dhabi
The Fletcher School at Tufts University alumni
Year of birth missing (living people)
Living people